Amon Sur is a supervillain in the DC Universe. He is the son of the Green Lantern Abin Sur and nephew of the villain/antihero Sinestro by marriage with Sur's sister Arin.

Publication history
Amon Sur first appeared in Green Arrow (vol. 3) #24 (June 2003) and was created by writers Judd Winick and Ben Raab, and artist Charlie Adlard.

Fictional character biography
Amon Sur first appeared in the storyline "Black Circle: Urban Knights," a bi-weekly crossover between Green Arrow (vol. 3) #23-25 and Green Lantern (vol. 3) #162-164.

Amon Sur grew up to become the man in charge of the Black Circle crime syndicate. Amon was angry with his deceased father. He felt Abin had abandoned him in favor of the Green Lantern Corps and decided to take his anger out on all Green Lanterns. Amon is eventually stopped by Hal Jordan's successor, Kyle Rayner, and a second-generation Guardian of the Universe named Lianna. Lianna decapitates Amon, but since the head is not a crucial appendage to Ungarans, he survives and eventually regrows a new head.

Years later, Amon searches for and has a confrontation with Hal Jordan, who has returned to his Green Lantern role after being freed from the influence of Parallax. Hal defeats the insane youth, but Amon receives a duplicate of Sinestro's ring from the Qwardians and vanishes. After Hal finally takes Abin's body home and buries it, a mysterious yellow light appears in the sky after Hal leaves, presumably Amon arriving to visit his father's grave.

Sinestro Corps
Amon Sur is soon recruited by the Sinestro Corps and was chosen to represent Space Sector 2814. The Sinestro Corps originally tried to recruit Batman for the role, but his strong sense of will and previous contact with a Green Lantern ring allows him to fight its influence. When the Sinestro Corps invades Earth, Amon Sur is at first delighted. However, upon learning and witnessing that the Green Lantern Corps had now been authorized to use lethal force, he becomes fearful and flees.

After the war, Amon Sur is found by a contingent of Green Lanterns on the planet Varva, having murdered deceased Lantern Ke'Haan's family. Amon declares he will surrender peacefully and elaborates that his motive is that other Yellow Lanterns, still on the run, will then learn what he did and murder the families of other fallen Lanterns. To prevent this, Ke'Haan's close friend and Lantern Laira executes him. His ring leaves him after his death and heads for the planet Earth. Hal Jordan and John Stewart stop the ring from recruiting the villain known as the Scarecrow. The ring is destroyed by the Corps' leaders, the Guardians. Amon's body is sent to Oa. When Laira realizes that her friends believe she committed murder, she grows enraged and incinerates Amon's body to prevent any chance of resurrection.

Blackest Night
During the Blackest Night storyline, Amon is reanimated as a Black Lantern. He and other reanimated Sinestro Corpsmen accost Sinestro at the home of the Star Sapphires. The acidic Sinestro Corpsman Slushh is briefly able to stop Amon engulfing him in Slushh's goo which causes Amon's ring to come off. However, another ring quickly flies onto the finger of his skeletal remains. Only the combined attack of Hal Jordan and members of the Indigo Tribe is able to cripple and destroy him.

Powers and abilities
Due to his Ungaran physiology, Amon can naturally regenerate most of his limbs, even his head.

As member of the Sinestro Corps, he uses a yellow power ring built on Qward. The rings can create objects based on the wielders own thoughts as well as provide flight and force field protection. The power rings are fueled by fear instead of willpower. The yellow rings are charged by Manhunter androids that have yellow power batteries built into themselves, which in turn are connected to a large yellow Power Battery based on Qward. The rings have no known weaknesses, unlike a Green Lantern power ring's previous vulnerability to yellow. Also, the yellow rings are not restricted from killing sentient beings as the Green Lantern's power rings were, although it is revealed later that blue rings can deplete yellow rings quickly and indigo tribesman can redirect its energy. As a Yellow Lantern, Amon is an excellent intimidator, his ability to instill fear in others being what led to his recruitment to the Sinestro Corps. However, unlike his father, Amon is a coward, ironic as he wields the power of fear.  He initially attacked the Green Lanterns believing that they could only attack him, but once he realized they could kill, he fled in terror.

As a member of the Black Lantern Corps, Amon wields a black power ring. It too can provide flight and can create constructs out of black energy. The ring allows Amon's corpse to identify when a person is feeling one of the seven colored emotions. At that moment, a Black Lantern can then remove that person's heart, thereby supplying the entire Black Corps with a .01% power boost.

In other media

Video games
 Amon Sur appears in the video game Green Lantern: Rise of the Manhunters (set in the same continuity as the live-action movie) voiced by Steve Blum. He attends his father's funeral on Oa, expressing gratitude that his father met his successor before he died. Sometime after the funeral, the Manhunters attack Oa. However, Amon is later revealed to have betrayed the Corps to the Manhunters as part of a plan to 'avenge' himself against the Corps as he was angry that his father's ring was passed to a 'primitive' like Hal Jordan rather than himself, providing the Manhunters with the chance to gain access to the yellow fear energy that the Guardians had kept contained in a secret vault to give them the power to destroy the Corps. Despite wielding a staff empowered by the yellow energy, Amon Sur is finally defeated by Jordan in a final attack on Oa.
 Amon Sur appears in DC Universe Online.

References

External links
 Dcuguide First appearance
 Newsarama Geoff Johns - Amon Sur, and everything Green Lantern
 Wizard Article on the members of the Sinestro Corps
 Newsarama Tapping in to Evil: Ethan Van Sciver on Sinestro Corps

Comics characters introduced in 2003
DC Comics characters with accelerated healing
DC Comics extraterrestrial supervillains
Fictional murderers
DC Comics aliens
DC Comics supervillains
Characters created by Judd Winick